Class 93 may refer to:
British Rail Class 93 (InterCity 250), an unbuilt locomotive type, planned by British Rail.
British Rail Class 93 (Stadler), an upcoming tri-mode electric-diesel-battery locomotive, built by Stadler Rail.
DRG or DR Class 93, a German 2-8-2 tank locomotive operated by the  Deutsche Reichsbahn:
Class 93.0-4: Prussian T 14, PKP Class Tkt 1, SNCB Class 97
Class 93.5-12: Prussian T 14.1, Württemberg T 14, PKP-Class Tkt 2 
Class 93.13-14: BBÖ Class 378
Class 93.15: ČSD Class 423.0
Class 93.1601 + 1602: MFWE Nos. 33 and 34
Class 93.1611 + 1612: PE Nos. 7 and 22
Class 93.64: diverse locomotives taken over in 1949 by the Deutsche Reichsbahn
Class 93.65: locomotive taken over in 1949 by the Deutsche Reichsbahn BStB No. 59
Class 93.66: diverse locomotives taken over in 1949 by the Deutsche Reichsbahn
Class 93.67: locomotives taken over in 1949 by the Deutsche Reichsbahn HBE Nos. 10 to 12